N-(n-Butyl)thiophosphoric triamide (NBPT) is the organophosphorus compound with the formula SP(NH2)2(NHC4H9).  A white solid, NBPT is an "enhanced efficiency fertilizer", intended to limit the release of nitrogen-containing gases following fertilization. Regarding its chemical structure, the molecule features tetrahedral phosphorus bonded to sulfur and three amido groups.

Use
NBPT functions as an inhibitor of the enzyme urease. Urease, pervasive in soil microorganisms, converts urea into ammonia, which is susceptible to volatilization if produced faster than it can utilized by plants.  Approximately 0.5% by weight NBPT is mixed with the urea.

See also
 Phenyl phosphorodiamidate, another urease inhibitor

References

Thiophosphoryl compounds
Soil improvers
Fertilizers